Róbert Madej (born 3 January 1981 in Zvolen) is a Slovak attorney and former politician, who served as a member of the National Council from 2002 to 2020.

Madej studied law at the Comenius University, graduating in 2004. Already as a student, he was included on the electoral list of the Direction – Slovak Social Democracy party in 2002 following his victory in student essay competition organized by the party along with a fellow winner Edita Angyalová. In 2013 he received his PhD in law from Pavol Jozef Šafárik University. In 2002 Slovak parliamentary election, he was elected an MP at the age of 22. In 2020 he retired from politics to focus on the legal practice and family.

References 

Direction – Social Democracy politicians
Slovak lawyers
People from Zvolen
Living people
1981 births
Comenius University alumni
Members of the National Council (Slovakia) 2002-2006
Members of the National Council (Slovakia) 2006-2010
Members of the National Council (Slovakia) 2010-2012
Members of the National Council (Slovakia) 2012-2016
Members of the National Council (Slovakia) 2016-2020